.np is the Internet country code top-level domain (ccTLD) for Nepal. It is administered by Mercantile Communication Pvt Ltd.

Registration

Domain registrations under .np ccTLD is free of cost. Registrants need to provide proof of Nepali citizenship for personal websites or 
a copy of company registration for organization websites. Foreign nationals with a Non-Resident-Nepalese ID Card or Nepalese resident visa can also register a domain. Foreign companies are required to have an official presence in Nepal as a joint venture, partnership, agent, or a licensee in order to qualify to register a domain. It could take a working day to get the domain reviewed.

Registered domain name must be an exact match, abbreviation or acronym of the registrant's name of trademark; or otherwise closely and substantially connected to the registrant.

.gov.np domains are managed by and registered through National Information Technology Center.

Structure 

Registrations are taken only at the third level, under a number of second-level domains.

References

External links
 IANA .np whois information

Country code top-level domains
Mass media in Nepal
Communications in Nepal
Internet in Nepal
1995 establishments in Nepal

sv:Toppdomän#N